Unicorn is the name of several supervillains appearing in American comic books published by Marvel Comics.

Publication history

The first Unicorn (Milos Masaryk) debuted in Tales of Suspense #56 (Aug. 1964) and was created by Stan Lee and Don Heck.

Fictional character biography

Milos Masaryk

Milos Masaryk was a Soviet intelligence agent assigned to track down the original Crimson Dynamo, who defects to America. Wearing technology designed by the Dynamo, Masaryk gives himself the alias the "Unicorn" and battles Iron Man, but is defeated. The Unicorn was among the villains affected by Doctor Doom's high-frequency emotion charger, and was compelled to attack the Fantastic Four at the wedding of Reed Richards and Susan Storm.

The Unicorn later allied himself with Count Nefaria. He then underwent experimental conditioning to augment his powers. With increased strength, he battled Iron Man once more after attempting to extort money from the U.S. Congress, but is defeated again. The process left the Unicorn with "accelerated cellular deterioration", and he is taunted with a cure by the villainous Red Ghost in exchange for assistance against Iron Man. However, once it becomes evident that the Red Ghost has lied, the Unicorn aids Iron Man and later escapes.

The Mandarin makes a similar promise to the Unicorn and deploys him against Iron Man on two separate occasions, both ending in Unicorn's defeat. In the first instance, the Mandarin's consciousness becomes entrapped in the Unicorn's body, but the Mandarin's mind is later freed from the Unicorn's body. Using the alias "The Other", the Titanium Man uses the Unicorn against Iron Man who is finally able to capture Masaryk. In a dramatic turn, the very moment of his capture sees Masaryk slip into a life-threatening coma. Iron Man takes Masaryk to the Avengers Mansion, where teammate Yellowjacket wakes Masaryk and cures him of his debilitating disease. The process has the result of driving Masaryk insane, and a disorientated Unicorn inadvertently activates the hidden robot Arsenal. The Unicorn is stunned by the robot — which Iron Man drives off — and then placed in stasis pending a cure for his mental illness. 

Months later, Masaryk is freed when a fire breaks out at Stark Enterprises. He resumes the identity of the Unicorn and finds and attacks Iron Man once again. Still insane, the Unicorn refuses to believe that "The Other" was a lie, and begins to walk back to the Soviet Union via the ocean to find him. A severely weakened Iron Man can only watch as the Unicorn apparently drowns in the Atlantic Ocean. 

The Unicorn is later revived by the entity the Beyonder to fight with a new version of the Lethal Legion. The Unicorn is given a true third eye on a stalk with energy projection capabilities in lieu of a suit.

During the "Infinity" storyline, Unicorn is among the villains recruited by Spymaster to help him attack the almost-defenseless Stark Tower.

Iron Man and Hellcat later find Unicorn trying to steal the Gutenberg Bible. Korvac witnesses the fight and uses lightning to strike Iron Man, which also destroyed the Gutenberg Bible. Unicorn later appears to help Korvac, Blizzard, and Controller fight Iron Man and Hellcat.

Yegor Balinov
A second unnamed (at the time of his debut) Unicorn with a developed tentacled eye within his power-horn appears as a member of Remont 4 and goes on a rampage in St. Petersburg until captured by the third Titanium Man. His third eye is then amputated and he is incarcerated. 

During the Civil War storyline, the second Unicorn is approached by Baron Zemo and forced to either join Zemo's team of Thunderbolts or go to jail. He chooses to join and fights on the team's behalf.

He is next seen in Hulk: Winter Guard along with Iron Maiden, Titanium Man, Volga, and the Snow Leopards as Remont 6.

This versions' real name is revealed to be Yegor Balinov in Official Handbook of the Marvel Universe A-Z hardcover vol. 13.

Aaidan Blomfield
A third Unicorn, whose real name is Aaidan Blomfield and wore the same Unicorn costume as his predecessors, only with an actual horn on the helmet, is recruited into the supervillain group Stockpile by Morgan Stark to destroy Iron Man, but they are defeated by the combined efforts of Iron Man and War Machine. Blomfield claimed to be an old foe of Iron Man's, but it is unknown if he really is, or was just riding on the reputation of the original Unicorn. His accent suggests he is either Australian or British.

Unnamed criminal
Roderick Kingsley later sold one of the Unicorn's outfits to an unnamed criminal. Unicorn is seen working for Roderick Kingsley's side at the time when Hobgoblin (who was actually Roderick Kingsley's butler Claude) was leading his forces into attacking the Goblin King's Goblin Nation.

Following Spider-Man's victory over the Goblin King, Unicorn was among the former Hobgoblin minions at the Bar with No Name where they encounter Electro.

During the AXIS storyline, Unicorn was among the supervillains that Missile Mate assembled to join the side of Phil Urich (who was operating as Goblin King) and the remnants of the Goblin Nation upon claiming that Roderick Kingsley "abandoned" them.

Roderick Kingsley later regains Unicorn's services.

Powers and abilities
Originally, the Unicorn had no superhuman powers; his helmet was the source of his abilities. However, the Unicorn has undergone mutagenic radiation treatments which gave him superhuman strength and endurance. The Unicorn's soft tissues are dozens of times harder than those of an ordinary human, making him highly resistant to physical injury. The process which endowed the Unicorn with superhuman powers caused accelerated cellular deterioration, which eventually severely affected his sanity and physical health.

He wears headgear equipped with an energy projector that tunes to various frequency and power levels. This allows him to project concussive energy blasts (electron or neutron beams), lasers, and microwave energy. It also allows him to project a force field and to levitate objects magnetically. He also wears a rocket belt equipped with twin, high-efficiency electric micro turbines that allow him to fly; the belt also contains the power supply for his helmet which consists of an array of nuclear-powered thermo-electric cells. The Unicorn also wears body armor of unknown composition.  His equipment was designed by Professor Anton Vanko.

The Unicorn is a formidable hand-to-hand combatant, having received training in armed and unarmed combat by the KGB. He is highly proficient in the use of firearms. He is highly fluent in both English and Russian, and has received KGB training in intelligence techniques.

Other versions

Ultimate Marvel
The Ultimate Marvel version of the Unicorn briefly appears as a participant in the abandoned Russian supersoldier program. This version is one of many convicts found by the Ultimates in the Tunguska base who were altered using biotechnology torn from the Vision, and driven mad by years of isolation. He appears to have the power to project electricity from his horn, to levitate, and enhanced durability. He is killed by Nick Fury.

In other media
 The Milos Masaryk incarnation of Unicorn appears in Iron Man: Armored Adventures, voiced by Michael Daingerfield. This version is an enforcer for the Maggia in season one and Justin Hammer / Titanium Man in season two who is often paired with Killer Shrike.
 Unicorn will appear in the Marvel Cinematic Universe / Disney+ series Spider-Man: Freshman Year (2024).

References

External links
 
 Unicorn at MarvelDirectory.com
 

Comics characters introduced in 1964
Characters created by Jack Kirby
Characters created by Stan Lee
Fictional characters with superhuman durability or invulnerability
Fictional Russian people
Fictional secret agents and spies in comics
Male characters in comics
Marvel Comics characters with superhuman strength
Marvel Comics mutates
Marvel Comics supervillains